Governor Emilio Gaston Memorial Elementary School or locally known as GEGMES is one of the public schools in Silay City. It is located at Rizal Street, next to the Doña Montserrat Lopez Memorial High School. The school was named after the late Negros Occidental governor and Silay City municipal president, Emilio Gaston.

History 
Established in 1939, Governor Emilio Gaston Memorial Elementary School is one of the oldest educational institutions in Silay City, Negros Occidental. The campus has a land area of 7,772 square meters. The school site was donated by the late Don Julio Ledesma, one of the most prominent families of Silay City. However, the school was named after the late provincial governor and municipal president, Emilio Gaston. In 1941–1943, during the Japanese Imperial Government's occupation in the Philippines, the school was the seat of its government and military garrison.

Emilio Gaston 

Emilio Gaston was the former municipal president of Silay City from 1925 to 1930. He was born on December 16, 1880, and died a day after the celebration of the charter day of Silay City on June 13, 1937. Gaston was also the governor of Negros Occidental from 1934 to 1937.

See also 
 Doña Montserrat Lopez Memorial High School
 Silay South Elementary School
 Don Estaquio Hofileña Memorial Elementary School
 La Purisima Concepcion Elementary School
 Silay North Elementary School

References

External links 
 Map of GEGMES
 School Panpages

Schools in Silay
Elementary schools in the Philippines
Public schools in the Philippines